Emmanuel Klein (February 4, 1908 – May 31, 1994) was an American jazz trumpeter most associated with swing.

Career
Born in New York City, New York, Klein began recording with The Ambassadors for Vocalion in 1924, worked with Paul Whiteman in 1928 and was active throughout the 1930s as a studio musician and playing with Jimmy Dorsey, Tommy Dorsey, Benny Goodman, the Boswell Sisters and others. In 1937, he moved to California and worked with Frank Trumbauer's orchestra. In 1939 he declined an offer from Fritz Reiner to join the Pittsburgh Symphony. In early 1940 he appeared on Artie Shaw recordings. He worked on soundtracks and played trumpet for the film From Here to Eternity (1953) but was uncredited. He worked with musicians associated with West Coast jazz in the 1950s. Klein voiced-over Ziggy Elman's trumpet parts on the soundtrack of the movie The Gene Krupa Story.

Klein studied with Max Schlossberg of the New York Philharmonic. Although he did not play first trumpet, he was a member of the NBC Symphony Orchestra under Arturo Toscanini. In 1953, he appeared on the Capitol Records album Concerto In C Minor For Piano by Dmitri Shostakovich and The Four Temperaments by Paul Hindemith with Victor Aller and Felix Slatkin.

During the early 1960s, Mannie Klein appeared on several Dean Martin recordings. He played piccolo trumpet on Hugo Montenegro's hit version of the main theme to the film The Good, the Bad and the Ugly (1966).

In the 1970's, Klein toured and recorded as a freelance jazz musician, notably in Holland with the Ted Easton Jazzband and American trombone veteran Spiegle Willcox and tenorist Bert Noah.

Death
Klein died at the age of 86 in Los Angeles, California, on May 31, 1994.

Partial discography
With Sammy Davis Jr
It's All Over but the Swingin' (Decca, 1957)
With Junior Mance
Get Ready, Set, Jump!!! (Capitol, 1964)
With Pete Rugolo
Ten Trumpets and 2 Guitars (Mercury, 1961)
With the Vince Guaraldi Sextet
It's the Great Pumpkin, Charlie Brown: Music from the Soundtrack (Concord, 1966)

Partial filmography
From Here to Eternity (1953) - Trumpet Player (uncredited)
A Symposium on Popular Songs (1962, Short) - Musician-Trumpet (final film role)

References
 Allen P. Britton, Michael Meckna: Twentieth-century brass soloists. Greenwood Press, Westport, Conn, 1994.
 Michael Cuscuna, Michel Ruppi: The Blue Note label. A discography. Greenwood Press, Westport, Conn. 2001.
 Colin Larkin: The Encyclopedia of Popular Music. Third edition. Macmillan, New York, N.Y. 1998.

External links
[ All Music]

American jazz trumpeters
American male trumpeters
1908 births
1994 deaths
American people of Dutch-Jewish descent
20th-century American musicians
20th-century trumpeters
20th-century American male musicians
American male jazz musicians
The Dorsey Brothers members